Daniela Álvarez (born 28 December 1983) is a Bolivian former professional tennis player.

Biography
Born in Santa Cruz, Álvarez debuted for the Bolivia Fed Cup team at the age of 14 and was a junior doubles quarter-finalist at the 2001 French Open. She competed on the ITF circuit until 2002, winning four doubles titles. In 2003 she represented Bolivia at the Santo Domingo Pan American Games.

Álvarez retired from the tour in 2003 and played college tennis at South Carolina's Clemson University for four years, graduating with a sports management degree in 2006. She never returned to the circuit but did play another year of Fed Cup tennis for Bolivia in 2007 and ended her Fed Cup career having appeared in a total of 27 ties.

Her younger sister, María Fernanda Álvarez, was also a tennis player.

ITF finals

Doubles: 7 (4–3)

References

External links
 
 
 

1983 births
Living people
Bolivian female tennis players
Clemson Tigers women's tennis players
Sportspeople from Santa Cruz de la Sierra
Pan American Games competitors for Bolivia
Tennis players at the 2003 Pan American Games
20th-century Bolivian women
21st-century Bolivian women